Exie Lee Hampton (1893 – 1979), born Exie Lee Kelley, was an American educator, community leader and clubwoman in Southern California. She served on the national board of the YWCA during World War II, and was executive director of the Eastside Settlement House in Los Angeles after the war.

Early life
Exie Lee Kelley (or Kelly) was born in Boone County, Missouri. She attended Lincoln Institute in Jefferson City, Missouri, and Kansas State Agricultural College, earning a bachelor's degree in home economics. She pursued further training in summer sessions at Columbia University and the University of Southern California.

Career
Hampton was a home economics teacher. By 1921, she was a teacher-trainer at West Virginia State College, at Wilberforce University, and at Branch Normal School in Pine Bluff, Arkansas. She taught for five years at East Side High School in El Centro, California.

In the early 1930s, she became executive director of the Clay Street Clubs, which she developed with others into the Clay Avenue YWCA, a branch that served African-American girls and women in San Diego's Logan Heights neighborhood. She left the San Diego work to join the national board of the YWCA, in the USO division, during World War II. She was also active in the San Diego chapter of the NAACP.

In 1946, she became executive director of the Eastside Settlement House in Los Angeles. In 1961, she was leader of the Victoria Business and Professional Women's Club of Riverside, California. She was on the first board of directors of the Inland Area Urban League, when it started in 1966.

Hampton was active in the black sorority Alpha Kappa Alpha for many years. In 1937, she attended and spoke at the western regional conference of the group. In 1950, she chaired the western regional conference.

Personal life
Exie Lee Kelley married a pastor, Charles H. Hampton, in 1929, and as the pastor's wife was active in women's groups in the Baptist churches in El Centro  and San Diego. Rev. Hampton was president of the Western Baptist State Convention for over thirty years, before he died in 1979.  Exie Lee Hampton also died in 1979, in San Diego,  in her eighties.

References

External links
 A photograph of Exie Lee Hampton in the 1940s, "Children receive food at the Eastside Settlement House, Los Angeles, ca. 1941-1950", in the Charlotta Bass / California Eagle Photograph Collection, University of Southern California Libraries.
 A photograph of Exie Lee Hampton with other members of the Riverside NAACP, at Riversider website.

1893 births
1979 deaths
20th-century African-American women
20th-century African-American educators
20th-century American women educators
20th-century American educators
African-American schoolteachers
Alpha Kappa Alpha members
Home economists
Kansas State University alumni
Lincoln University (Missouri) alumni
People from Boone County, Missouri
People from San Diego
Schoolteachers from California
University of Arkansas at Pine Bluff faculty
West Virginia State University faculty
Wilberforce University faculty
YWCA leaders